Star Raiders is a first-person space combat simulator for the Atari 8-bit family of computers. It was written by Doug Neubauer, an Atari employee, and released as a cartridge by Atari in March 1980. The game is considered the platform's killer app. It was later ported to the Atari 2600, Atari 5200, and Atari ST.

The game simulates 3D space combat between the player's ship and an invading fleet of alien "Zylon" vessels. Star Raiders was distinctive for its graphics, which, in addition to various map and long range scan views, provided forward and aft first-person views, with movement conveyed by a streaming 3D starfield as the player engaged enemy spacecraft.

While there had already been target-shooting games using the first-person perspective (including 1978's Cosmic Conflict), Star Raiders had considerably higher quality visuals and more complex gameplay. It inspired imitators throughout the 1980s as well as later-generation space combat simulation games including Elite, Wing Commander, and Star Wars: X-Wing.

In 2007, Star Raiders was included in a list of the 10 most important video games of all time, as compiled by Stanford University's History of Science and Technology Collections.

Gameplay
Like the text-based Star Trek games, in Star Raiders the player's ship maneuvers about a two-dimensional grid fighting a fleet of enemy spaceships. In Star Raiders, this part of the game takes the form of a "Galactic Chart" display dividing the game's large-scale world into a grid of sectors, some of which are empty, while others are occupied by enemy ships or a friendly "starbase". The Galactic Map is the equivalent of the earlier Star Trek'''s Long Range Scan.

Flying about in the 3D view with the ship's normal engines is sufficient for travel within a sector; travel between sectors is via "hyperspace", accomplished through an elaborate and noisy "hyperwarp" sequence with graphics loosely reminiscent of the Star Wars and Star Trek films in which the stars seemed to stretch to radial lines. On the higher difficulty levels, hyperwarp has a skill element; the player has to keep a wandering cross hair roughly centered during the sequence in order to arrive precisely at the desired destination.

Combat, damage and resources

To the Star Trek formula, the game added real-time 3D battles as a space combat simulator. In the main first-person display, the player can look out of the ship and shoot "photons" at Zylon ships, which come in three different varieties reminiscent of ships from Star Wars, Star Trek, and Battlestar Galactica (whose villains were the similarly titled Cylons).

A small targeting display in the lower right corner gives a general indication of a distant enemy or starbase's position relative to the player's ship, and also indicates when weapons are locked on the enemy, at which point the player's weapons will fire two torpedoes simultaneously. There is also a "long-range scan" screen showing the surrounding region in a third-person overhead view centered on your ship, operating like a long-range radar display.

Enemy ships come in three types. The standard Fighters resemble the TIE fighter. The Patrol ships, which do not fire until fired upon, loosely resemble the front-on view of a Cylon Raider or Klingon Battlecruiser. The most powerful Zylon ship, the Basestar, has a pulsating orange glow and resembles a Cylon Basestar. It also has shields, which protect it from incoming fire, thus requiring the player to either hit it multiple times in rapid succession at close range or get it into a Target Lock, which results in two torpedoes being fired simultaneously and tracking the target until impact.

The game has four difficulty levels; on all but the lowest "Novice" level players must steer the ship into hyperspace and collisions with random meteoroids and enemy fire can cause damage to the player's ship. Such damage includes malfunctioning or nonfunctional shields, engines, weapons or information displays. Any collision when shields are down destroys the ship and ends the game. Running out of energy likewise ends the game.

The player has to manage finite energy reserves as well as damage to the ship; it can be repaired and restocked by rendezvous with a friendly starbase. The enemy can also destroy a starbase if allowed to surround its Galactic Chart sector for too long, so the starbases have to be defended. All this lends Star Raiders a degree of complexity and a sense of player immersion that was rare in action games of the era.

Scoring
In contrast to many games of the era, the player can actually win the game by destroying all enemy ships in the galaxy. However, there is no running score display; only upon winning, dying or quitting the game will the player receive a "rating", which is a quasi-military rank accompanied by a numerical class with particularly bad play earning a rank of "Garbage Scow Captain" or "Galactic Cook". The rating depends on a formula involving the game play level, energy and time used, star bases destroyed (both by player or the enemy), the number of enemies destroyed, and whether the player succeeded in destroying all enemies, was destroyed, or aborted (quit or ran out of energy) the mission. Some possible ratings reach from Rookie to Star Commander.

Development
Wanting to make an action-oriented Star Trek-type game, Doug Neubauer designed Star Raiders in about eight to ten months while working for Atari. He left the company while the game was still a prototype to return home to Oregon and join Hewlett-Packard, and reported that it took him six months to reach the highest player-level during development. Star Raiders was unusual at the time for Atari, as it made relatively few game cartridges for its computers, with most being adaptations of Atari 2600 titles.

Technical details

The main simulation continues running even when the user is interacting with other displays. For instance, one might be attacked while examining the Galactic Map. This was unusual for the time, if not unique.

The primary playfield/star field is drawn in the graphics mode that provides 160×96 bitmapped pixels utilizing four color registers at a time out of a palette of 128 colors provided by the CTIA chip in the early Atari computers. This is called ANTIC mode D, but accessed in Atari BASIC by use of the "GRAPHICS 7" command. The Atari's use of an indirect palette means that color changes associated with the presence or absence of energy shields, emergency alarms, and the screen flash representing destruction of the ship can be accomplished by simply changing the palette values in memory registers.

Enemy ships, shots, and most other moving objects use Atari's variant of hardware sprites, known as player-missile graphics, which have their own color registers independent of the current screen graphics mode. The radar display in the lower right of screen is drawn using the background graphics, and updated less frequently than the sprites.

The debris particles emitted when an enemy ship is destroyed are calculated as 3D points. Since the 6502 processor in the Atari 8-bit family does not have a native multiply or divide command, the game slows down considerably when several of these particles are active.

When rotating the view of the player's ship, the new positions of enemy ships, shots, and other moving objects are computed in 3D, applying a variation of the CORDIC algorithm using only addition, subtraction, and bitshift operations.

The Atari 8-bit family allows different graphics modes and color palettes to be used in different horizontal bands on the screen, by using a simple display list and a type of horizontal blank interrupt. While other games make more extensive use of these techniques, Star Raiders uses them in a relatively simple fashion to combine text displays and graphics; the cockpit display uses a custom character set to display futuristic-looking characters and symbols reminiscent of MICR.Star Raiders' sounds of engines, shots, explosions, alarms, etc. are algorithmically synthesized directly using the POKEY sound chip's capabilities. Neubauer was involved in the design of POKEY.

The entire game, code and data, fits into 8K (8192 bytes) of ROM, and requires only 8K of RAM for its working data and display visuals; thus it can run on any Atari 8-bit computer.

Ports

Versions of Star Raiders were created for the Atari 2600, Atari 5200, and Atari ST series of computers.

The Atari 5200 version was done by programmer Joe Copson and released in autumn 1982. This version is nearly identical to the computer version, but takes advantage of the 5200's analog joystick by allowing for variable speed turning, and puts all the game functions in the player's hand via the controller's 12-button keypad. Other changes are graphical improvements to the Sector Scan mode by displaying small images of enemy ships and objects instead of pinpoints, alterations to some of the text responses to be more specific to the game-ending action, and automatically switching to Forward View when Hyperspace is engaged.

The Atari 2600 version was programmed by Carla Meninsky and released in 1982. It suffers somewhat due to the 2600's weaker graphics and sound capabilities. It shipped with a special keypad controller, the Video Touch Pad, to take the place of the computer keyboard. Although the controller was designed to accept overlays for compatibility with multiple games, Star Raiders was the only game to utilize it. In this version the Zylons are renamed "Krylons".

The Atari ST version was designed and programmed by Robert Zdybel with graphics and animation by Jerome Domurat and released by Atari Corporation in 1986. It is a very different game in many ways, with more enemy ship types, different weapons, slower action, and a map featuring a triangular grid instead of a square one, which makes it much easier for the Zylon ships to surround starbases.

Reception
While criticizing the violent gameplay, after seeing a demonstration Ted Nelson wrote: "The Atari machine is the most extraordinary computer graphics box ever made, and Star Raiders is its virtuoso demonstration game". Compute! in 1980 wrote that Star Raiders is "incredibly exciting to play and just about as much fun to watch!" It praised the game's use of color and sound to alert the player, and warned that "THIS GAME IS ADDICTIVE!". The magazine InfoWorld wrote: "This game is absolutely guaranteed to put calluses on your trigger-finger". The magazine reported that Star Raiders complexity encouraged cooperative gameplay, and that "over twenty hours of grueling tests by a battery of ingenious children" had proven that it was free of bugs.BYTE wrote in 1981 that it was the Atari's killer app: "What can you say about a game that takes your breath away? There are not enough superlatives to describe Star Raiders. Just as the VisiCalc software ... has enticed many people into buying Apple II computers, I'm sure that the Star Raiders cartridge ... has sold its share of Atari 400 and 800 computers". It concluded: "To all software vendors, this is the game you have to surpass to get our attention". Electronic Games agreed, reporting that it "is the game that, in the opinion of many, sells a lot of 400 computers systems", and "has established the standards prospective software marketed will be trying to surpass over the next year or so".Softline in 1982 called Star Raiders "quite a game ... stands repeat play well and remains quite difficult". In 1983 the magazine's readers named it "The Most Popular Atari Program Ever", with 65% more weighted votes than second-place Jawbreaker, and in 1984 they named the game the most popular Atari program of all time. The Addison-Wesley Book of Atari Software 1984 gave it an overall A rating, praising the realistic graphics and sound. The book concluded that "the game is simply great" and that despite imitations, "Star Raiders remains the classic". Antic in 1986 stated that "it was the first program that showed all of the Atari computer's audio and visual capabilities. It was just a game, yes, but it revolutionized the idea of what a personal computer could be made to do".

Jerry Pournelle of BYTE named the Atari ST version his game of the month for August 1986, describing it as "like the old 8-bit Star Raiders had died and gone to heaven. The action is fast, the graphics are gorgeous, and I've spent entirely too much time with it".

In 2004, the Atari 8-bit version of Star Raiders was inducted into GameSpot's list of the greatest games of all time. On March 12, 2007, The New York Times reported that Star Raiders was named to a list of the ten most important video games of all time, the so-called game canon. The Library of Congress took up a video game preservation proposal and began with the games from this list, including Star Raiders. In 1995, Flux magazine ranked the game 46th on their "Top 100 Video Games."

ReviewsGamesLegacy
Sequels
 Star Raiders II (1986) 

The Star Raiders II that was released in 1986 by Atari Corp. had no relationship to the original other than the name, and was, in fact, merely a rebranded game originally developed as a licensed tie-in for the movie The Last Starfighter.

 Unreleased Star Raiders II 
In 2015, Kevin Savetz, host of the ANTIC Podcast, was contacted by former Atari, Inc. programmer Aric Wilmunder. Wilmunder mentioned he had been part of a team working on 8-bit computer games and decided to make a sequel to Star Raiders.

This version of Star Raiders II is faithful to the original gameplay, but designed to make use of new 32 kB cartridges. The torpedoes were replaced with a laser-like weapon that can be aimed semi-independently of the ship's motion. The enemies are now 3D wireframe ships instead of 2D sprites. The gridded galactic map was replaced with a free-form version. In this rendition, the player's home planet is in the upper left of the map, and the enemy ships are ultimately attempting to attack it. A number of planets can also be attacked on the surface in a view based on the Star Wars arcade game, which was being developed down the hall from Wilmunder's office.

The main part of the game was complete by early 1984, but Atari was in disarray and undergoing a continual downsizing. Eventually, he was laid off, but kept the source code when he left. He later unsuccessfully tried to interest the new Atari Corporation in the project.

The game, in an untuned but functionally complete and playable state, was added to the Internet Archive along with basic documentation and Wilmunder's telling of the history of the game.

2011 remake
A re-imagining of Star Raiders, developed by Incinerator Studios and published by Atari SA, was released for the PlayStation 3, Xbox 360 and Microsoft Windows on May 11, 2011.

Clones and influenced games
Many games heavily inspired by Star Raiders appeared, such as Starmaster (Atari 2600), Space Spartans (Intellivision), Moonbeam Express (TI-99/4A), Codename MAT (ZX Spectrum and Amstrad CPC), Star Voyager (Atari 2600) and Star Luster (Famicom–Japan only). Neubauer's own Solaris, for the Atari 2600, is both similar and in some ways more sophisticated than  his  earlier game, despite the difference in technology between the two systems.Star Raiders inspired later space combat games like Elite, the Wing Commander series and BattleSphere.Star Rangers, an homage to Star Raiders, was released in 2010 for the iPhone. It was written by former 8-bit game programmer Tom Hudson, who was at one time a technical editor for Atari hobbyist magazine ANALOG Computing. As of October 2014, possibly earlier, Star Rangers is no longer in the iOS App Store.

In popular culture
In 1983 DC Comics published a graphic novel inspired by the game; it was the first title of the DC Graphic Novel series. It was written by Elliot S! Maggin and illustrated by José Luis García-López. Early production copies of the Atari 2600 version of the game were accompanied by an Atari Force mini-comic (published by DC Comics). This particular issue was #3 in the series, preceded by mini-comics accompanying the Defender and Berserk games. Two final mini-comics followed with the games Phoenix and Galaxian.

 Source code 
A scan of the original assembly language source code became available in October 2015 via the Internet Archive. It was used to create a text-file version in GitHub.

References

External links

Interview with Doug Neubauer, October 1986 issue of ANALOG Computing''
Reverse engineered source code with documentation

1980 video games
Atari 2600 games
Atari 5200 games
Atari 8-bit family games
Atari ST games
Science fiction video games
Space combat simulators
Video games adapted into comics
Video games developed in the United States
Commercial video games with freely available source code